Kumbotso is a Local Government Area in Kano State, Nigeria. Its headquarters are in the town of Kumbotso. It has an area of 158 km and a population of 409,500 based on the 2016 population projection.

The postal code of the area is 700.

References

Local Government Areas in Kano State